An Introduction to the Rock-Forming Minerals, by William Alexander Deer, Robert Andrew Howie, and Jack Zussman, is a book often considered the "bible" of mineralogy. It covers hundreds of minerals, with details of their structure, chemistry, optical and physical properties, distinguishing features, and paragenesis. Entries range from one or two pages for obscure minerals, to dozens of pages for important ones like feldspars. The first edition was published in 1966, and a substantially expanded second edition in 1992. A third edition was published in 2013.
It is intended as a reference book for undergraduate and postgraduate students.

Introduction to the Rock-forming Minerals is a condensed version of the multi-volume work Rock-forming Minerals by the same authors, which was published in 1962-3 with a second edition beginning in 1978, totalling 11 volumes. The condensed version omits some references, etymology, and chemical analysis present in the larger work.

Editions 
 W.A. Deer, R.A. Howie, and J. Zussman. (1962). An Introduction to the Rock-forming Minerals. London: Longmans. 528pp. 
 W.A. Deer, R.A. Howie, and J. Zussman. (1992). 2nd ed. An Introduction to the Rock-forming Minerals. Essex: Longman Scientific and Technical; New York: Wiley. . 696pp. 
 W.A. Deer, R.A. Howie, and J. Zussman. (2013). 3rd ed. An Introduction to the Rock-forming Minerals. London: Mineralogical Society. . 498pp.

References

External links
Biography of William Alexander Deer

Geology textbooks
1966 non-fiction books
Mineralogy
Prentice Hall books